This is a list of vessels damaged, sunk or captured during the Russo-Ukrainian War, including the 2014 annexation of Crimea, the 2018 Kerch Strait incident and the 2022 Russian invasion of Ukraine.

List of ships

2014 annexation of Crimea

Russian Navy
  — The  was scuttled in the Donuzlav Bay, Crimea, Ukraine, on 6 March 2014. The scuttling was part of the 2014 Russian annexation of Crimea and intended to block ships of the Ukrainian Navy. Ochakov was raised and scrapped at Inkerman in 2015.
 VM-416 — The Yelva-class diving support vessel was scuttled next to Ochakov on 7 March 2014.

Ukrainian Navy
 At least 100 Ukrainian Navy vessels were captured by Russian forces during the capture of Southern Naval Base, Sevastopol Bay and Striletska Bay, 35 of which were returned by June 2014 (inclusive). According to one estimate, 75% of the Ukrainian naval fleet was captured in 2014.

Ukrainian Sea Guard
 Numerous Ukrainian Sea Guard vessels were captured by Russian forces during the capture of Southern Naval Base, Sevastopol Bay and Striletska Bay.

Civilian vessels
 Numerous civilian vessels owned by the Ukrainian state were expropriated by Russia during the annexation of Crimea.

2014—2015 War in Donbas

Ukrainian Sea Guard 
 BG-119 KaMO-527 — The Zhuk 1400M-class gunboat was destroyed by DPR forces near Mariupol on 31 August 2014.
 1 Kalkan-class patrol cutter  — The boat was damaged by DPR forces near Mariupol on 31 August 2014.
 BG-22 — On 7 June 2015, the  patrol cutter exploded and then sank in Mariupol while leaving the ship-bay parking lot. On 26 May 2017, the boat was put back into service after being raised and repaired.

2018 Kerch Strait incident

Russian Navy
 Izumrud — The patrol boat was damaged during the Kerch Strait incident of 25 November 2018 after colliding with the Russian tug Don.
 1 unidentified vessel was damaged the same day while ramming the Ukrainian tugboat Yany Kapu.

Ukrainian Navy
 P175 Berdiansk and P176 Nikopol — The two Gyurza-M-class artillery boats were damaged and captured by Russian ships on 25 November 2018. The ships were returned to Ukraine on 18 November 2019.
 A947 Yany Kapu — The Prometey-class tugboat was damaged and captured by Russia on 25 November 2018. It was returned to Ukraine on 18 November 2019.

2022 Russian invasion of Ukraine

Russian Navy

 5 Raptor-class patrol boats — On 22 March 2022, a video appeared of a Raptor-class patrol boat being hit and damaged by an ATGM. According to Russian sources, it had to be towed away afterwards. On the first week of May 2022, Ukrainian forces using Bayraktar TB2 drones attacked four Raptor-class boats (in addition to one BK-16 high speed assault boat, mentioned below) near Snake Island. The extent of the damage was not initially known, but it emerged that three boats were destroyed while one of the Raptor boats withstood the damage and was filmed in Sevastopol for repairs.
 Saratov — On 24 March 2022, a Russian Navy Alligator-class landing ship that was docked in Berdiansk, Ukraine, caught fire. The Ukrainian military claimed that they had hit it, that it was destroyed and that it was the Orsk. Later the General Staff of the Ukrainian Armed Forces claimed that Saratov had been destroyed. Two other Russian ships, the Caesar Kunikov, and the Novocherkassk, that were docked nearby sailed away, with fire and smoke billowing out of one. On 2 July 2022, Russian official said the ship was scuttled back in March by its own crew in order "to prevent detonation of the on-board munitions by the fire that had started" due to a Tochka-U ballistic missile that hit the port. Also it became known that Saratov has been salvaged and will be towed to Kerch, Crimea.
  — On 13 April 2022, two Ukrainian officials said that the Slava-class cruiser had been hit by Ukrainian Neptune anti-ship missiles and was on fire in heavy seas. The Russian Ministry of Defense said the ship was seriously damaged after a fire caused a munitions explosion. The next day, Russian officials said that the ship had sunk while being towed to port.
 BK-16 high-speed assault boat - In the first week of May 2022, a video appeared of a Ukrainian Bayraktar TB2 drone hitting and sinking a high-speed assault boat near Snake Island. The wreck was later recovered.
Serna-class landing craft - On 7 May 2022, a video appeared of a Ukrainian Bayraktar TB2 drone hitting and sinking a landing craft on Snake Island.
Veliky Ustyug - On 17 June 2022, a photo emerged of the ship being towed on the Volga River in a damaged state. The Buyan-M-class corvette had participated in the 2022 Russian invasion of Ukraine.
Vasily Bekh — On 17 June 2022, Ukraine claimed to have sunk the rescue tug ("Spasatel") Vasily Bekh with two Harpoon missiles causing it to sink shortly thereafter. Shortly after the sinking, on 21 June, British military intelligence confirmed the attack, stating that the vessel sunk was almost certainly Vasily Bekh.
Ivan Golubets - On 29 October 2022, Ukrainian forces used an Unmanned Aerial and Submarine Vehicle to strike Russian forces in Sevastopol, Crimea. According to Russia, Ukrainian UAVs slightly damaged the Natya-class minesweeper.

Ukrainian Navy
 A206 Vinnytsia - Previously converted to an auxiliary ship in 2018 and decommissioned in 2021. In June 2022, footage emerged showing the Grisha II-class ship sunk at moorings, allegedly after a Russian attack on 24 February 2022.
 8 unidentified vessels were claimed, on 26 February 2022, as destroyed by Russian forces.
 F130 Hetman Sahaidachny — Flagship of Ukraine. On 3 March 2022, was reported by Ukrainian forces that the Krivak-III class frigate was scuttled in Mykolayiv to prevent its capture by the Russian Navy.
 P190 Sloviansk — On 3 March 2022 the patrol boat was sunk by a Russian aircraft using an X-31 air-to-surface missile.
  - In August 2022, Ukrainian officials reported the loss of the Yevgenya-class minesweeper during the opening phases of the Russian invasion alongside P190 Sloviansk.
 P186 Korets — A  sea-going tug converted to a patrol vessel was captured by Russian forces during the takeover of Berdiansk.
 5 Gyurza-M-class gunboats — P174 Akkerman and P179 Vyshhorod were captured by Russian forces during the takeover of Berdiansk. P177 Kremenchuk was captured by Russian forces during the Siege of Mariupol. P178 Lubny was declared missing by Ukraine; the ship was sunk and then raised by Russia during the Siege of Mariupol. On 4 November 2022, one Gyurza-M class boat from the Ukrainian Navy was damaged by Russian ZALA Lancet loitering munition near Ochakiv.
 A512 Pereyaslav – A Project 1824 reconnaissance ship damaged by gunfire at the Dnieper river on 30 March 2022, according to Russian sources.
 A500 Donbas (command ship) — On 6 April 2022, satellite images showed the ship being engulfed in heavy smoke in the port of Mariupol, later Ukrainian Defence Ministry confirmed the ship was destroyed during the Siege of Mariupol.
 L450 Stanislav — On 29 November 2022, Ukrainian media reported the loss of the Centaur-LK-class fast assault craft Stanislav during the 7 May 2022 Ukrainian counterattacks on Snake Island.
 8-10 attack/reconnaissance USVs — Head no. 45V2NS1 was captured and subsequently destroyed by Russia in September 2022. In an attack on 29 October, 2022, Russia claimed Ukraine used seven USVs; independent analysis indicated the use of six to eight vessels, among which at least two were destroyed by Russia and at least three detonated when they hit Russian vessels.
 One USV was reported to have detonated in an attack on the Sheskharis oil terminal in Novorossiysk on 17 November, 2022.

Unaccounted for East of the Kerch Strait 
 Dmitry Chubar — A Rubin-class hydrographic boat. It was most likely captured or destroyed between the beginning of the full-scale invasion and 20 May 2022 (inclusive); in 2021, it was reported to be deployed in Berdyansk, east of the Kerch Strait – prior to this. In May 2022, satellite imagery of a Rubin-class boat captured by Russia in Mariupol emerged.

Ukrainian Sea Guard 
 4 Zhuk-class patrol boats – BG-118 Arabat and one unidentified boat were captured at Berdyansk. BG-108 KaMO-517 and one unidentified boat were destroyed, and their wrecks subsequently captured, during the Siege of Mariupol.
 6 Kalkan-class patrol cutters – BG-308, BG-310 and BG-311 were captured at Berdyansk. BG-304 (which was awaiting repair prior to capture), BG-309 and one unidentified boat were captured during the Siege of Mariupol.
 4  patrol cutters – BG-14 and BG-24 were captured at Berdyansk. BG-22 and BG-23 both damaged and captured by Russia during the Siege of Mariupol.
 BG-732 – An Adamant 315-class motor yacht captured at Berdyansk.
 BG-32 Donbas – A Stenka-class patrol boat sunk during the Siege of Mariupol. In June 2022, it was reported that Russian forces raised the ship and sent it to Novosibirsk for repairs.
 1 BRIG Navigator N730M – A RIB most likely destroyed in the Siege of Mariupol.

Sighted on Airbase Forums 
 BG-40 – A BRIG Navigator N700M RIB which was captured during the Siege of Mariupol.

State Border Guard Service of Ukraine

Sighted on Airbase Forums 
 BG-721 – A UMS-600-class patrol cutter captured by Russia in May 2022.

Unaccounted for East of the Kerch Strait 
 BG-59 Onyx – A border support ship converted from a fishing vessel in 2000. It was most likely captured or destroyed between the beginning of the full-scale Russian invasion of Ukraine and 20 May 2022 (inclusive); as of 2020, it was reported to be deployed in Mariupol, east of the Kerch Strait - prior to this.

Other Naval vessels
On 9 September 2022, the engine of the Romanian Navy minesweeper Lieutenent Dimitrie Nicolescu was damaged by the explosion at the waterline of a floating sea mine, 40 km off Constanța. There were no casualties.

Civilian vessels
  SGV-Flot — The ore-bulk-oil carrier, owned by the Samarashipping and heading from Batumi to Yeysk, was struck by a missile fired by Ukrainian forces in the Sea of Azov off Dolzhanskaya, Russia at around 11:00 a.m. on 24 February 2022 and was moderately damaged, according to the Russian border guard service at Krasnodar. They claimed that two crew were injured, one of them seriously.
  Seraphim Sarovskiy — The general cargo ship, owned by the Rechmortrans and following the route from Turkey to Azov, was struck by a missile fired by Ukrainian forces in the Sea of Azov off Dolzhanskaya, Russia at around 11:00 a.m. on 24 February 2022 and was moderately damaged, according to the Russian border guard service at Krasnodar.
  Yasa Jupiter — The bulk carrier, owned by the Turkish Ya-Sa Holding, was struck by a missile fired by Russian forces in the Black Sea off Odessa, Ukraine on 24 February 2022 and was damaged. She was on a voyage from the Dniepr to Constanța, Romania.
   — The chemical tanker was shelled in the Black Sea off the coast of Ukraine on 25 February 2022. Its crew of ten were rescued.
   — The cargo ship was struck in the Black Sea off the coast of Ukraine by a missile fired by Russian forces on 25 February 2022. There was no casualties reported and ship remains afloat.
  Sapphire - On 26 February 2022, the civilian rescue ship was captured by Russian forces after trying to rescue Ukrainian sailors at Snake Island. On 25 March, The crew was returned as part of a prisoner exchange. On 8 April, Russia returned the ship to Ukrainian authorities.
  Afina - On 26 February 2022, the bulk carrier was captured by Russian forces near Snake Island en route to Constanța, Romania. It was later released.
  Princess Nikol - On 26 February 2022, the bulk carrier was captured by Russian forces near Snake Island en route to Constanța, Romania.
  Lady Anastasia — The motor yacht, owned by Russian oligarch and Rosoboronexport head Aleksandr Mikheyev, experienced an attempted scuttling a Ukrainian mechanic on its crew at Palma de Mallorca, Spain on 27 February 2022.
  Banglar Samriddhi — The bulk carrier belonging to the Bangladesh Shipping Corporation was struck by a Russian missile at Mykolaiv and was set afire on 2 March 2022. One crew member, third engineer Hadisur Rahman, was killed.
  Helt — The cargo ship, owned by the Tallinn-based Vista Shipping Agency, sank off the coast of Ukraine on 2 March 2022, likely after striking a mine. The Panama Maritime Authority later reported that the ship was sunk by a Russian missile. Four crew members were initially reported as missing and were later found. Also reported to have been captured by the Russian Navy and used as a shield against Ukrainian shellfire.
  Lord Nelson — The Panama Maritime Authority reported that Russian missiles had damaged the Panamanian-flagged Lord Nelson. The ship remains afloat with no casualties reported.
  Azburg — The cargo ship was shelled and sunk on 4 April 2022 during the Battle of Mariupol, after being damaged the day before by two Russian missiles. One crew member was injured.
  Kapitan Belousov — According to the Ukrainian military, the Mariupol Port Authority-owned icebreaker was shelled, during the Battle of Mariupol, overnight between 7 and 8 April 2022. One crew member was killed and several injured.
  Apache — According to Russian Ministry of Defence spokesman Igor Konashenkov, the bulk carrier, belonging to Turkey-based Misha Shipping, was fired upon by a patrol vessel of the Black Sea Fleet while in the Sea of Azov on 8 April. The bombardment started a fire to the stern which was extinguished by her crew. Konashenkov called the vessel a "Ukrainian cargo ship" and claimed that she had diverted from a convoy in an attempt to evacuate leaders of the Azov Battalion and mercenaries from Mariupol. Konashenkov reported no injuries, and that the vessel along with her crew were being escorted to Yeysk.
  Smarta — Ukrainian reports claimed that the bulk carrier, docked at Mariupol, was shelled and boarded by Russian forces. Verkhovna Rada Human Rights Ombudsmаn Lyudmyla Denisova claimed that the crew member was taken "in an unknown direction."
  10 unidentified vessels — The State Border Guard Service of Ukraine stated on 13 April 2022 that eight Russian cargo ships and two tankers, originally docked in Odessa for maintenance, were seized to "serve in the interests of Ukraine to restore its economy."

Sighted on Airbase Forums 
  Dmitry Triteykin — A rescue boat (a Stadtline 38S-class motor yacht) of the State Emergency Service of Ukraine. On 9 September 2022, a photo emerged of the vessel's wreck ashore; it had been deployed in the Sea of Azov as of 2018, east of the Kerch Strait – prior to its destruction.

See also
 List of aircraft losses during the Russo-Ukrainian War
 List of Black Sea incidents involving Russia and Ukraine

Notes

References

ship losses
Russo-Ukrainian War
Russo-Ukrainian War
Military equipment of the 2022 Russian invasion of Ukraine